The 2016–17 season was Partick Thistle's fourth consecutive season in the top flight of Scottish football and their fourth season Scottish Premiership, having been promoted from the Scottish First Division at the end of the 2012–13 season. Thistle also competed in the League Cup and the Scottish Cup.

Scottish Premiership

Scottish League Cup

Group stage 
Results

Group E Table

Knockout stage

Scottish Cup

Squad statistics

Appearances 

|-
|colspan="14"|Players away from the club on loan:

|-
|colspan="14"|Players who left Partick Thistle during the season:

|}

Goal scorers

Disciplinary record

Results summary

Transfers

In

Out

Loans in

Loans out

See also
 List of Partick Thistle F.C. seasons

Notes

References

External links
Official website

Partick Thistle F.C. seasons
Partick Thistle